Masanobu Okubo (大久保 勝信; born September 13, 1976 in Hidaka District, Wakayama, Japan) is a former Nippon Professional Baseball pitcher.

External links

1976 births
Living people
Baseball people from Wakayama Prefecture
Ritsumeikan University alumni
Japanese baseball players
Nippon Professional Baseball pitchers
Orix BlueWave players
Orix Buffaloes players
Nippon Professional Baseball Rookie of the Year Award winners